Jacob Koppel Javits (May 18, 1904 – March 7, 1986) was an American lawyer and politician. During his time in politics, he represented the state of New York in both houses of the United States Congress. A member of the Republican Party, he also served as the state's Attorney General. Generally considered a liberal Republican, he was often at odds with his own party. A supporter of labor unions, Great Society and civil rights, he played a key role in the passing of civil rights legislation. An opponent of the War in Vietnam, he drafted the War Powers Resolution in 1973.

Born to Jewish parents, Javits was raised in a tenement on the Lower East Side of Manhattan. He graduated from the New York University School of Law and established a law practice in New York City. During World War II, he served in the United States Army's Chemical Warfare Department. Outraged by the corruption of Tammany Hall, Javits joined the Republican Party and supported New York Mayor Fiorello H. La Guardia. He was elected to the House of Representatives in 1946 and served in that body until 1954. In the House, Javits supported President Harry S. Truman's Cold War foreign policy and voted to fund the Marshall Plan. He defeated Franklin Delano Roosevelt Jr. in the 1954 election for Attorney General of New York, and defeated Democrat Robert F. Wagner Jr. in the 1956 United States Senate elections.

In the Senate, Javits supported much of Lyndon B. Johnson's Great Society programs and civil rights legislation, including the Civil Rights Act of 1964 and the Voting Rights Act of 1965. He voted for the Gulf of Tonkin Resolution but came to question Johnson's handling of the Vietnam War. To rein in presidential war powers, Javits sponsored the War Powers Resolution. Javits also sponsored the Employee Retirement Income Security Act, which regulated defined-benefit private pensions. In 1980, Javits lost the Republican Senate primary to Al D'Amato, who campaigned to Javits's right. Nonetheless, he ran in the general election as the Liberal Party nominee. He and Democratic nominee Elizabeth Holtzman were defeated by D'Amato. Javits died of amyotrophic lateral sclerosis in West Palm Beach, Florida in 1986.

Early life
Javits was born to Jewish parents, Ida (née Littman) and Morris Javits, a descendant of the 17th-century rabbi Jacob Emden who was known as the Ya'avetz, which was later anglicized to Javits. Javits grew up in a teeming Lower East Side tenement, and when not in school, he helped his mother sell dry goods from a pushcart in the street and learned parliamentary procedure at University Settlement Society of New York. Javits graduated in 1920 from George Washington High School, where he was president of his class. He worked part-time at various jobs while he attended night school at Columbia University, then in 1923 he enrolled in the New York University Law School from which he earned his LLB in 1926. He was admitted to the bar in June 1927 and joined his brother Benjamin Javits, who was nearly ten years older, as partner to form the Javits and Javits law firm. The Javits brothers specialized in bankruptcy and minority stockholder suits and became quite successful. In 1933, Javits married Marjorie Joan Ringling, daughter of Alfred Theodore "Alf" Ringling of Ringling Brothers Circus fame. They had no children and divorced in 1936. In 1947, he married Marion Ann Borris with whom he had three children. Deemed too old for regular military service when World War II began, Javits was commissioned in early 1942 as an officer in the U.S. Army's Chemical Warfare Department, where he served throughout the war and reached the rank of lieutenant colonel.

Political career
In his youth Javits had watched his father work as a ward heeler for Tammany Hall, and he had experienced firsthand the corruption and graft associated with that notorious political machine. Tammany's operations repulsed Javits so much that he forever rejected the city's Democratic Party and in the early 1930s joined the Republican-Fusion Party and The New York Young Republican Club, which was supporting the mayoral campaigns of Fiorello H. La Guardia. After the war, he became the chief researcher for Jonah Goldstein's unsuccessful 1945 bid for mayor on the Republican-Liberal-Fusion ticket. Javits's hard work in the Goldstein campaign showed his potential in the political arena and encouraged the small Manhattan Republican Party to nominate him as their candidate for the Upper West Side's Twenty-first Congressional District (since redistricted) seat during the heavily-Republican year of 1946. Although the Republicans had not held the seat since 1923, Javits campaigned energetically and won. He was a member of the freshman class, along with John F. Kennedy of Massachusetts and Richard M. Nixon of California. He served from 1947 to 1954, when he resigned his seat to take office as New York State Attorney General.

Throughout his career in Congress, first in the House and later in the Senate, Javits was part of a small group of liberal Republicans that was often isolated ideologically from their mainstream Republican colleagues. One scoring method found Javits to be the most liberal Republican to serve in either chamber of Congress between 1937 and 2002. Although he frequently differed with the more conservative members of his party, Javits always maintained that a healthy political party should tolerate diverse opinions among its members. He rejected the idea that either party should reflect only one point of view. Javits liked to think of himself as a political descendant of Theodore Roosevelt's Progressive Republicanism. He was strongly committed to social issues and believed that the federal government should have a role in improving the lives of Americans.

During his first two terms in the House, Javits often sided with the Truman administration. For example, in 1947 he supported Harry Truman's veto of the Taft-Hartley Bill, which he declared to be antiunion. A strong opponent of discrimination, Javits also endorsed legislation against the poll tax in 1947 and 1949, and in 1954, he unsuccessfully sought to have enacted a bill banning segregation in federally-funded housing projects. Unhappy with the witch hunt atmosphere in Washington during the Cold War, he publicly opposed continuing appropriations for the House Un-American Activities Committee in 1948. Always a staunch supporter of Israel, Javits served on the House Foreign Affairs Committee during all four of his terms and supported congressional funding for the Marshall Plan and all components of the Truman Doctrine.

In 1954, Javits ran for New York State Attorney General against a well-known and well-funded opponent, Franklin Delano Roosevelt Jr. Javits's vote-getting abilities carried the day, and he was the only Republican to win a statewide office that year. As attorney general, Javits continued to promote his liberal agenda by supporting such measures as anti-bias employment legislation and a health insurance program for state employees.

U.S. Senator

In 1956, Javits ran for U.S. Senator from New York to succeed the retiring incumbent Democrat Herbert H. Lehman. His Democratic opponent was the popular Mayor of New York, Robert F. Wagner Jr. In the early stages of that campaign Javits vigorously and successfully denied charges that he had once sought support from members of the American Communist Party during his 1946 race for Congress. He went on to defeat Wagner by nearly half a million votes. Although his term began on January 3, 1957, he delayed taking his seat in the U.S. Senate until January 9, the day the New York State Legislature convened, to deny Democratic Governor W. Averell Harriman the opportunity to appoint a Democratic Attorney General. Thus, on January 9, the Republican majority of the State Legislature elected Louis Lefkowitz to fill the office for the remainder of Javits's term.

Upon taking office, Javits resumed his role as the most outspoken Republican liberal in Congress.  For the next 24 years, the Senate was Javits's home. His wife had no interest in living in Washington, D.C., which she considered a boring backwater and so for over two decades Javits commuted between New York and Washington nearly every week to visit his "other" family and conduct local political business. In foreign affairs, he backed the Eisenhower Doctrine for the Middle East and pressed for more foreign military and economic assistance. Javits was re-elected in 1962 and 1968.

Javits voted in favor of the Civil Rights Acts of 1957, 1960, 1964, and 1968, as well as the 24th Amendment to the U.S. Constitution, the Voting Rights Act of 1965, and the confirmation of Thurgood Marshall to the U.S. Supreme Court. He endorsed Lyndon Johnson's Great Society programs. To promote his views on social legislation, he served on the Senate Labor and Human Resources Committee for twenty years, most of that time as the second-ranking minority member. Javits initially backed Johnson during the early years of America's involvement in the Vietnam War and supported, for example, the Gulf of Tonkin Resolution in 1964 but later turned against it. Javits also supported a single-payer healthcare system and coined the term "Medicare for all." Also in 1964, Javits joined David Rockefeller to launch the non-profit International Executive Service Corps, which was established to help bring about prosperity and stability in developing nations through the growth of private enterprise.

In 1966, along with two other Republican senators and five Republican representatives, Javits signed a telegram sent to Georgia Governor Carl E. Sanders regarding the Georgia legislature's refusal to seat the recently-elected Julian Bond in their state House of Representatives. The refusal, said the telegram, was "a dangerous attack on representative government. None of us agree with Mr. Bond's views on the Vietnam War; in fact we strongly repudiate these views. But unless otherwise determined by a court of law, which the Georgia Legislature is not, he is entitled to express them."

By the end of 1967, Javits was becoming disenchanted with the Vietnam War and joined 22 other senators in calling for a peaceful solution to the conflict.

In 1965, Javits appointed Lawrence Wallace Bradford Jr. as the Senate's first African-American page. In 1971, Javits appointed Paulette Desell as the Senate's first female page.

By 1970, his rising opposition to the war led him to support the Cooper-Church Amendment, which barred funds for US troops in Cambodia, and he also voted to repeal the Gulf of Tonkin Resolution. Increasingly concerned about the erosion of congressional authority in foreign affairs, Javits sponsored the 1973 War Powers Act, which limited to 60 days a president's ability to send American armed forces into combat without congressional approval.

Despite his unhappiness with President Richard Nixon over the Vietnam War, Javits was slow to join the anti-Nixon forces during the Watergate scandal of 1973–1974. Until almost the very end of the affair, his position reflected his legal training: Nixon was innocent until proven guilty, and the best way to determine guilt or innocence was by legal due process. His position was unpopular among his constituency, and his re-election in Watergate-tainted 1974 elections over Ramsey Clark was by fewer than 400,000 votes, a third of his 1968 margin of victory. During his last term. Javits shifted his interests more and more to world affairs, especially the crises in the Middle East. Working with President Jimmy Carter, he journeyed to Israel and Egypt to facilitate the discussions that led to the 1978 Camp David Accords.

1980 Senate race

Javits served until 1981; his 1979 diagnosis with amyotrophic lateral sclerosis (also known as Lou Gehrig's Disease) led to a 1980 primary challenge by the comparatively lesser-known Long Island Republican county official Al D'Amato, who received 323,468 primary votes (55.7 percent) to Javits's 257,433 (44.3 percent). Javits's loss to D'Amato stemmed from Javits's continuing illness and from his failure to adjust politically to the rightward movement of the Republican Party.

After the primary defeat, Javits ran as the Liberal Party candidate in the general election. His candidacy split the Democratic base vote with United States Representative Elizabeth Holtzman of Brooklyn and gave D'Amato the victory by a plurality of 1%. Javits received 11% of the vote.

Death
Javits died of amyotrophic lateral sclerosis (ALS) in West Palm Beach, Florida, at the age of 81 in March 1986. In addition to spouse Marion Ann Borris Javits, he was survived by three children: Joshua, Carla, and Joy. He was predeceased by his brother, who died in 1973. His nephew, Eric M. Javits, was a diplomat who served as the U.S. Representative to the Organisation for the Prohibition of Chemical Weapons and the Conference on Disarmament. He is interred at Linden Hill Jewish Cemetery in Queens, New York.

Javits' funeral service was conducted at the Central Synagogue in Manhattan. 1400 people attended the funeral. Among them were former President Richard Nixon, Governor Mario Cuomo and former Governor Hugh Carey, Mayor Ed Koch and former Mayor John Lindsay, Attorney General Edwin Meese, former Secretary of State Henry Kissinger, Cardinal John Joseph O'Connor, Kurt Vonnegut, David Rockefeller, Victor Gotbaum, Douglas Fairbanks Jr and Arthur Ochs Sulzberger. Other mourners included Senators Al D'Amato of New York, Senators Nancy Kassebaum Baker of Kansas, Bill Bradley of New Jersey, Lowell Weicker of Connecticut, as well as former U.S. Representative Bella Abzug.

Legacy
Throughout his years in Congress, Javits seldom enjoyed favor with his party's inner circle. Few pieces of legislation bear his name, yet he was especially proud of his work in creating the National Endowment for the Arts, of his sponsorship of the ERISA, which regulated defined-benefit private pensions, and of his leadership in the passage of the 1973 War Powers Act. In 1966, he had a 94% rating from the Americans for Democratic Action.

Javits used his office to advance ideas that furthered the policies even of Democratic presidents. In the fall of 1962, he proposed to a group of NATO parliamentarians that multinational corporations jointly create a new kind of investment vehicle to promote private investment throughout Latin America. He intended his idea to complement President John F. Kennedy's Alliance for Progress. Two years later, some 50 multinational corporations formed the Adela Investment Company, much as Javits had proposed.

The senator was generally considered a liberal Republican and was supportive of labor unions and movements for civil rights. In an essay published in 1958 in the magazine Esquire, he predicted the election of the first African-American president by 2000. In 1964, Javits refused to support his party's presidential nominee, his conservative colleague, Barry M. Goldwater of Arizona.

Senator Javits sponsored the first African-American Senate page in 1965 and the first female page in 1971. His liberalism was such that he tended to receive support from traditionally-Democratic voters, with many Republicans defecting to support the Conservative Party of New York.

Javits played a major role in legislation protecting pensioners, as well as in the passage of the War Powers Act; he led the effort to get the Javits-Wagner-O'Day Act passed. He reached the position of Ranking Minority Member on the Committee on Foreign Relations while he accrured greater seniority than any New York Senator before or since. Along with Dwight Eisenhower, he was among the first and most important statesmen in passing legislation promoting the cause of education for gifted individuals, and many know his name from the federal Jacob Javits Grants established for that purpose.

Honors and commemoration
Javits received the Presidential Medal of Freedom in 1983.

New York City's sprawling Jacob K. Javits Convention Center was named in his honor in 1986, as is a playground at the southwestern edge of Fort Tryon Park. The Jacob K. Javits Federal Building at 26 Federal Plaza in lower Manhattan's Civic Center district, as well as a lecture hall on the campus of Stony Brook University on Long Island, are also named after him.

The Jacob K. Javits Gifted and Talented Students Education Act of 1988 was named in honor of Javits for his role in promoting gifted education. The United States Department of Education awards a number of Javits Fellowships to support graduate students in the humanities and social sciences.

The National Institutes of Health awards the Senator Jacob Javits Award in Neuroscience to exceptionally talented researchers in neuroscience who have established themselves with groundbreaking research. A 1983 US Congressional Act established those awards in honor of Senator Javits as a longtime supporter of research into understanding neurological disorders and diseases.

In his memory, NYU established the Jacob K. Javits Visiting Professorship in 2008.

Electoral history
U.S. House of Representatives, New York 21st District

New York State Attorney General

U.S. Senate, New York

See also 

 List of Jewish members of the United States Congress

References

Sources 

 
 
 Who's Who in America, 1966–1967

External links 

 Archive of Senator Jacob K. Javits at the Special Collections Department at Stony Brook University
 
 
 

1904 births
1986 deaths
20th-century American lawyers
20th-century American politicians
American people of Russian descent
American people of Ukrainian-Jewish descent
American prosecutors
Columbia University alumni
Neurological disease deaths in Florida
Deaths from motor neuron disease
George Washington Educational Campus alumni
Jewish American military personnel
Jewish American people in New York (state) politics
Jewish United States senators
Jewish members of the United States House of Representatives
Lawyers from New York City
Liberal Party of New York politicians
New York State Attorneys General
New York University School of Law alumni
People from the Lower East Side
People from the Upper West Side
Politicians from Manhattan
Presidential Medal of Freedom recipients
Recipients of the Four Freedoms Award
Republican Party United States senators from New York (state)
Republican Party members of the United States House of Representatives from New York (state)
United States Army officers
United States Army personnel of World War II
Yiddish-speaking people
Liberalism in the United States